Orsans may refer to the following places in France:

Orsans, Aude, a commune in the department of Aude
Orsans, Doubs, a commune in the department of Doubs